Eastbury Halt railway station was a railway station in Eastbury, Berkshire, UK, on the Lambourn Valley Railway.

History 
The station opened on 4 April 1898 as Eastbury. The vast majority of the station's traffic was milk; there was little demand for other goods and so the lack of a yard meant that the milk churns would be left on the platform to be collected.

On 9 July 1934, the station became unstaffed and was renamed Eastbury Halt.

The station closed to all traffic on 4 January 1960.

References 

Lambourn Valley Railway
Disused railway stations in Berkshire
Former Great Western Railway stations
Railway stations in Great Britain opened in 1898
Railway stations in Great Britain closed in 1960
Lambourn